Helton is an unincorporated community in Leslie County, Kentucky, United States.Its post office  is closed.

A post office was established in the community in 1885, and named for its first postmaster.

References

Unincorporated communities in Leslie County, Kentucky
Unincorporated communities in Kentucky